Scolia may refer to:

 Scolia (wasp), a genus in the family Scoliidae
 Skolion (pl. skolia or scolia), a song sung by invited guests at banquets in ancient Greece

See also
 Scholia, marginal commentaries in the manuscripts of ancient authors